Eurofins | BLC Leather Technology Centre or Eurofins | BLC is a testing, auditing and consulting business that specialises in chemicals, leather, footwear and other associated products and related materials, and is based in Northamptonshire. An additional specialism is the safe use and management of chemicals in the supply chain; a concept from which Eurofins | BLC developed the ZDHC approved Chem-MAP® certification process for chemicals, chemical companies, brands and their suppliers.

A significant item of note is that Eurofins | BLC is the official facilitator of the Leather Working Group (LWG) which is a significant environmental stewardship programme within the leather industry. The LWG has over 1600 member companies that includes over 150 major clothing and footwear brands.

Eurofins | BLC
In March 2018, BLC was acquired by Eurofins Scientific of Belgium who now have a majority share holding in the company.

See also
 Leather production processes

References

External links
 Eurofins | BLC Leather Technology Centre
 Eurofins | BLC Chemical Testing
 Chem-MAP® MRSL Verification System
 Leather Sustainability
 All About Leather

1920 establishments in the United Kingdom
Buildings and structures in Northampton
Leather industry
Materials science institutes
Research institutes established in 1920
Science and technology in Northamptonshire